Revis is a surname. Notable people with the surname include:

Beth Revis (born 1981), American author of fantasy and science fiction
Mike Revis, American politician
Darrelle Revis (born 1985), American football player
Eric Revis (born 1967), American jazz bassist and composer